John Leslie Pabst (28 March 1917 – 12 May 1992) was an Australian rules footballer who played with Hawthorn in the Victorian Football League (VFL). Between his two stints in the VFL, he served in the Australian Army during World War II.

Honours and achievements
Individual
 Hawthorn life member

Notes

External links 

1917 births
1992 deaths
Australian rules footballers from Victoria (Australia)
Hawthorn Football Club players
Australian Army personnel of World War II